Trace Bundy is an American acoustic guitar player who lives and performs in Boulder, Colorado. He is known to fans as "The Acoustic Ninja" for his legato and finger tapping skills. Bundy's guitar playing style is percussive and harmonic: he plays with both hands on the fretboard, intricate finger picking arpeggios and inventive use of multiple capos. He was showcased and eventually discovered on websites such as YouTube and Facebook.

Early life and development of playing style
Bundy was born in Austin, Minnesota and later moved to the small town of Buena Vista, Colorado. As a boy Bundy and his brother bought a guitar together, and Bundy began learning songs from guitar magazines.

Bundy is right-handed. During his teenage years he began experimenting with his playing style. He gave up using a guitar pick, and instead grew his fingernails long to develop his fingerpicking style. He also introduced a harmonic slapping technique, the use of various effects pedals, and capos.

Bundy met Jonah Werner (now an acclaimed acoustic folk songwriter) in high school and started playing with him at a local coffee shop in Buena Vista. The duo played mostly Jackopierce and other various folk songs. Bundy then met Tim Thornton from Newcomers Home and started playing old Dylan and Cat Stevens tunes. They all attended the University of Colorado at Boulder and still continue to play together from time to time.

Bundy moved to Boulder, Colorado and attended the University of Colorado where he earned his undergraduate and master's degrees in civil engineering, and then taught at the university for a further two years. During this period his concert bookings increased steadily, and eventually he decided to become a full-time musician.

Career
Bundy's first musical release was in 1999 with O Night Divine, a collection of traditional Christmas songs. His next recording, containing all original songs, was 2000's Solomon's Splendor.

In October 2004 he released a CD/DVD titled Adapt. The DVD is of a live concert filmed in Boulder in the summer of 2004.

Many clips from this DVD have circulated on YouTube and have received well over twenty-one million views. Some of the more popular clips are Bundy covering the Backstreet Boys song "I Want It That Way", and Pachelbel's Canon performed on an acoustic guitar using the fingertapping technique. Bundy acquired the nickname "Acoustic Ninja" after a review of one of his shows in a Colorado newspaper was titled "Attack of the Acoustic Ninja".

Following this album was A Few Songs for Christmas, an EP of more Christmas songs released in December 2007. In 2008, Bundy released Missile Bell, a two-part project consisting of a studio CD, a live CD, and a DVD filmed live at the Boulder Theater in November 2007. The album was inspired by a trip Bundy and his wife Becca made to Central America, accompanying a humanitarian group. At the end of 2008, Bundy was named "Most Promising New Talent of the Year" by Acoustic Guitar magazine, and came in third in the same magazine's "Best Fingerstyle Guitarist of the Year" category.

Touring with Sungha Jung In 2005 Bundy discovered a finger-picking guitar prodigy when he saw a YouTube video of a 9 year old Korean boy Sungha Jung playing Bundy's version of (Pachelbel's) Canon. Bundy twice toured South Korea and he would get in touch with Jung and have him open Bundy's shows. Then Bundy would call Jung up on the stage with him to play Cannon in unison. In 2009 Bundy flew Jung to the United States and the two did a U.S. West Coast tour. Since that time the two have played together often.

Bundy's most recent album, Elephant King, was released on May 1, 2012.

“In 2014 Bundy was announced as the winner of the ESPN SportsCenter Fan Jam contest while he performed the program's theme tune live on the show on March 4, 2014 at ESPN's studios in Bristol, Connecticut.”

In 2016 he was the subject of a short documentary film made by Florida State University student Robert Bevis, titled Acoustic Ninja. The film was included in the official selection of six film festivals, and was a finalist at the Emerging Filmmaker Showcase at the Cannes Film Festival in 2017.

Reviews
"Possessing a staggering acoustic technique, on both right and left sides, Bundy has made his reputation as a next generation solo guitarist of serious repute. Furious, marksman-like fretboard tapping, blizzards of bouncing harmonics, tricky in-song capo-sliding (or removal/addition), freehand guitar body tapping — Bundy combines a dizzying range of offbeat technical calisthenics and inverted melodic sense to create what can safely be characterized as performance art." Dave Kirby of the Boulder Weekly.

Personal life
Trace Bundy married Rebecca on September 3, 2002. Together they have two sons.

Discography
Releases on the Honest Ninja Music label:

O Night Divine (1999)
Solomon's Splendor (2000)
Adapt (2004)
A Few Songs for Christmas EP (2007)
Missile Bell (2008)
Elephant King (2012)

References

External links
Official Trace Bundy Web site
Official Myspace Profile
Trace Bundy on Sporscenter
Acoustic Ninja – Robert Bevis's documentary about Trace Bundy
Trace Bundy - Pachelbel's Canon

Living people
Fingerstyle guitarists
People from Austin, Minnesota
Musicians from Boulder, Colorado
American YouTubers
American male guitarists
1977 births